Henry Safford Neal (August 25, 1828 – July 13, 1906) was an American lawyer and politician who served two terms as a U.S. Representative from Ohio from 1877 to 1883.

Biography 
Born in Gallipolis, Ohio, Neal attended the common schools.
He was graduated from Marietta College (Ohio) in 1847.
He studied law.
He was admitted to the bar in approximately 1851 and commenced practice in Ironton, Ohio.
He served as prosecuting attorney of Lawrence County about 1851.
He served as member of the State senate from 1861 to 1863.
He was appointed consul to Lisbon, Portugal, in 1869.
By the resignation of the Minister Resident, he became Chargé d'Affaires in December 1869 and served until July 1870, when he resigned and returned to Ohio.
He served as delegate to the Ohio constitutional convention in 1873.

Congress 
Neal was elected as a Republican to the Forty-fifth, Forty-sixth, and Forty-seventh Congresses (March 4, 1877 – March 3, 1883).
He served as chairman of the Committee on District of Columbia (Forty-seventh Congress).
He was not a candidate for renomination in 1882.

Later career 
He resumed the practice of his profession at Ironton, Ohio.
He was appointed Solicitor of the Treasury by President Arthur and served from July 3, 1884, to April 13, 1885, when a successor was appointed by President Cleveland.

He again resumed the practice of law.

Death
He died in Ironton, Ohio, July 13, 1906.
He was interred in Woodland Cemetery.

Sources

External links 
 

1828 births
1906 deaths
Ohio Constitutional Convention (1873)
Republican Party Ohio state senators
Ohio lawyers
19th-century American diplomats
People from Gallipolis, Ohio
People from Ironton, Ohio
Marietta College alumni
County district attorneys in Ohio
19th-century American politicians
Republican Party members of the United States House of Representatives from Ohio